Isochronic tones are regular beats of a single tone that are used alongside monaural beats and binaural beats in the process called brainwave entrainment. At its simplest level, an isochronic tone is a tone that is being turned on and off rapidly. They create sharp, distinctive pulses of sound.

Isochoric tones can be differentiated with different levels of alertness and problem-solving capabilities, they can also be differentiated by the frequency of the noise 

Gamma: high levels of concentration, a problem solving mind.                                  

Beta: an active mind, waking state. 

Alpha: calm and composed mind. 

Theta: sleepy, tired mind. 

And Delta a sleeping state.

<https://www.healthline.com/health/isochronic-tones#what-they-are></ref>

See also

 Audio–visual entrainment
 Binaural beats
 Brainwave entrainment (Brainwave synchronization)
 Hemi-Sync
 Trance

References

Hearing
Auditory illusions
Pseudoscience
Devices to alter consciousness